The men's competition in the bantamweight (56 kg) division was staged on September 17–18, 2007.

Schedule

Medalists

Records

Results

References
Results 

Men's 56